Yayo Aguila (born Maria Rosario Racelis Aguila; September 13, 1967) is a Filipino actress whose career began through the cult film series Bagets.

Career
Yayo Aguila's career began in 1982. Her breakout film was the cult film Bagets, which was about a group of high school teenagers, playing the role of Rose. Despite her success, she would end up in a hiatus after marrying her co-star, William Martinez. She began her comeback with the film Kay Tagal Kang Hinintay in 1998. Yayo Aguila would later follow this project by starring in the television series Gimik and G-mik, which is also teen-oriented.

Yayo Aguila was part of the second season of the celebrity edition of Pinoy Big Brother. She voluntary exited on Day 71. She is currently seen on ABS-CBN.

Personal life
During the filming of her first project, Bagets, Yayo Aguila met her future husband, actor William Martinez. They separated in 2010 after 25 years of marriage.

One of Yayo Aguila's housemates in Pinoy Big Brother was actor Baron Geisler who was involved in a court case filed by her daughter after the reality show ended. Her daughter accused Geisler of acts of lasciviousness. He fought back by filing a perjury case against Yayo Aguila and her daughter.

Filmography

Film

Television

References

External links

1967 births
Living people
People from Quezon City
Actresses from Metro Manila
Filipino women comedians
Filipino film actresses
Filipino television actresses
ABS-CBN personalities
GMA Network personalities
TV5 (Philippine TV network) personalities
Star Magic personalities
Pinoy Big Brother contestants
20th-century Filipino actresses
21st-century Filipino actresses